Tomislav Puljić (born 21 March 1983) is a Croatian retired footballer who last played as a defender for the Swiss amateur side FC Emmenbrücke.

Career
In January 2011, Puljic signed an extended contract to stay at Luzern until June 2014.

Before the 2019–20 season, Puljić joined FC Emmenbrücke.

Honours
FC Vaduz
Liechtenstein Football Cup (1): 2017-18

References

External links

https://web.archive.org/web/20110207131511/http://tomislavpuljic.com/
http://justcantbeatthat.com/2011/tomislav-puljic-is-a-hero-or-lausanne-v-fcl-01/

1983 births
Living people
Sportspeople from Zadar
Association football defenders
Croatian footballers
NK Lučko players
NK Croatia Sesvete players
HNK Segesta players
NK Lokomotiva Zagreb players
FC Luzern players
FC Vaduz players
Croatian Football League players
Swiss Super League players
Swiss Challenge League players
Croatian expatriate footballers
Expatriate footballers in Switzerland
Croatian expatriate sportspeople in Switzerland
Expatriate footballers in Liechtenstein
Croatian expatriate sportspeople in Liechtenstein